Erynnis afranius, also known as the afranius duskywing or bald duskywing, is a species of butterfly of the  family Hesperiidae. It is found from northern Mexico through the central United States to southern Canada in the provinces of Alberta, Saskatchewan and Manitoba.

The wingspan is 25–31 mm. There can be two generations from mid-May to late August.

The larvae feed on Lupinus species, Lotus species and Thermopsis rhombifolia.

References

External links
Afranius Duskywing, BugGuide
Afranius Duskywing, Butterflies and Moths of North America

Erynnis
Butterflies of North America
Butterflies described in 1878
Taxa named by Joseph Albert Lintner